Louis-Francois-Auguste de Rohan-Chabot (1788-1833) was a French aristocrat and Catholic priest. He was Prince of Leon, the 8th Duke of Rohan, and Count of Porhoët. Upon becoming a widower, he entered the priesthood and eventually became Archbishop of Auch, Archbishop of Besançon, and a Cardinal.

References

1788 births
1833 deaths
19th-century French Roman Catholic bishops
Louis-François